Julie Hardt (born in 1983 in Carson City, NV) is a former American swimmer who won a gold medal as a member of the winning U.S. team in the women's 4×200-meter freestyle relay at the 2001 World Aquatics Championships in Fukuoka, Japan. She currently coaches for the Carson Tigersharks.

See also 
 List of University of Georgia people

References 

1983 births
Living people
American female freestyle swimmers
Georgia Bulldogs women's swimmers
World Aquatics Championships medalists in swimming